Luk De Koninck (born 8 July 1952, Belgium) is a Belgian television actor.

Education
De Koninck studied drama at the Koninlijk Conservatorium in Brussels, making his acting breakthrough in 1975, debuting in the TV series Klaaglied om Agnes in which he played the role of Jan.
He appeared in Belgian TV series such as Alfa Papa Tango (1990) and Flikken (1999).
He is most famous for appearing in 29 episodes of Familie, a series for which he also was casting director.

TV filmography

2000s
Witse .... Laurent Defraye (1 episode, 2006)
Dodenrit (2006) TV Episode .... Laurent Defraye
Onder ons gezegd en gezwegen (2005) TV Episode .... Toon Van Havere
FC de kampioenen - Jules (1 episode, 2004)
Sedes & Belli - Laurent Dewitte (1 episode, 2003)
Recht op recht - Crisismanager Broothaers (1 episode, 2001)

1990s
Flikken - Chauffeur (1 episode, 1999)
Deman - Jacques Demeester Jr. (1 episode)
Vennebos (1997)
Heterdaad - Onderzoeksrechter (1996–1998)
Wittekerke - Lukas Eerdekens (1993–1997)
Glas van roem en dood, Het (1992)
Alfa Papa Tango - Dominic (3 episodes, 1991)

1980s
Tot nut van 't algemeen - Valgaeren (1988)
Mijnheer Halverwege - Robert Vrijman (1987)
Hard Labeur - Louis Oemans (1985)
Klinkaart - Zwarte Jokke (1984)
Tony - Fred (1983) 
Toute une nuit (1982)
Witte, De - De Ruige (1980)

1970s
Place Saint Catherine (1979)
Het Testament - Jan (1978)
Wierook en tranen - Evarist (1977)
Sil de strandjutter - Wietze Droeviger (1976) 
Klaaglied om Agnes - Jan (1975)

External links
 

Belgian male television actors
Belgian male voice actors
Flemish male television actors
Flemish male voice actors
1952 births
Living people